The 64th Texas Legislature met from January 14, 1975, to June 2, 1975. All members present during this session were elected in the 1974 general elections.

Sessions
Regular Session: January 14, 1975 - June 2, 1975

Party summary

Senate

House

Officers

Senate
 Lieutenant Governor: William P. Hobby, Jr., Democrat
 President Pro Tempore: Glenn Kothmann, Democrat

House
 Speaker of the House: Bill Wayne Clayton, Democrat

Members

Senate

Dist. 1
 A.M. Aikin, Jr. (D), Paris

Dist. 2
 Peyton McKnight (D), Tyler

Dist. 3
 Don Adams (D), Jasper

Dist. 4
 D. Roy Harrington (D), Port Arthur

Dist. 5
William T. "Bill" Moore (D), Bryan

Dist. 6
 Lindon Williams (D), Houston

Dist. 7
 Bob Gammage (D), Houston

Dist. 8
 O.H. "Ike" Harris (R), Dallas

Dist. 9
 Ron Clower (D), Garland

Dist. 10
 Bill Meier (D), Euless

Dist. 11
 Chet Brooks (D), Houston

Dist. 12
 Betty Andujar (R), Fort Worth

Dist. 13
 Walter Mengden (R), Waco

Dist. 14
 Lloyd Doggett (D), Austin

Dist. 15
 Jack Ogg (D), Houston

Dist. 16
 Bill Braecklein (D), Dallas

Dist. 17
 A.R. "Babe" Schwartz (D), Galveston

Dist. 18
 W.N. "Bill" Patman (D), Ganado

Dist. 19
 Glenn Kothmann (D), San Antonio

Dist. 20
 Mike McKinnon (D), Corpus Christi

Dist. 21
 John Traeger (D), Seguin

Dist. 22
 Tom Creighton (D), Mineral Wells

Dist. 23
 Oscar Mauzy (D), Dallas

Dist. 24
 Grant Jones (D), Abilene

Dist. 25
 W. E. "Pete" Snelson (D), Midland

Dist. 26
 Frank Lombardino (D), San Antonio

Dist. 27
 Raul Longoria (D), Edinburg

Dist. 28
 Kent Hance (D), Lubbock

Dist. 29
 Tati Santiesteban (D), El Paso

Dist. 30
 Ray Farabee (D), Wichita Falls

Dist. 31
 Max Sherman (D), Amarillo

House

External links

64th Texas Legislature
1975 in Texas
1975 U.S. legislative sessions